Tournafulla GAA is a Gaelic Athletic Association club located in Tournafulla, County Limerick, Ireland. The club is primarily concerned with the game of hurling.

History

Located in the village of Tournafulla in West Limerick, Tournafulla GAA Club was founded by Fr. Michael Byrne in 1889. The club has competed in all grades of hurling in Limerick, however, as the county's smallest, the club has struggled to field teams on occasions due to emigration.

Tournafulla has enjoyed a number of championship successes over the years, however, one of the club's biggest occasions was appearing in the 1979 SHC final, only to lose to Patrickswell. The club enjoyed one of its greatest-ever seasons in 2003, winning the Limerick IHC, Limerick U21HC and Limerick JBHL titles. Tournafulla won the Limerick JAHC title in 2018 after beating arch-rivals Killeedy in the final.

Honours

Limerick Intermediate Hurling Championship (1): 2003
Limerick Junior Hurling Championship (1): 2018

Notable players

 Tim Doody: All-Ireland SHC-winner (1901)
 Séamus Horgan: All-Ireland SHC-winner (1973)

References

Gaelic games clubs in County Limerick
Hurling clubs in County Limerick